Armstrong's acid (naphthalene-1,5-disulfonic acid) is a fluorescent organic compound with the formula C10H6(SO3H)2.  It is one of several isomers of naphthalenedisulfonic acid. It a colorless solid, typically obtained as the tetrahydrate. Like other sulfonic acids, it is a strong acid.  It is named for British chemist Henry Edward Armstrong.

Production and use
It is prepared by disulfonation of naphthalene with oleum:
C10H8  +  2 SO3   →   C10H6(SO3H)2
Further sulfonation gives The 1,3,5-trisulfonic acid derivative.

Reactions and uses
Fusion of Armstrong's acid in NaOH gives the disodium salt of 1,5-dihydroxynaphthalene, which can be acidified to give the diol. The intermediate in this hydrolysis, 1-hydroxynaphthalene-5-sulfonic acid, is also useful.  Nitration gives nitrodisulfonic acids, which are precursors to amino derivatives.

The disodium salt is sometimes used as a divalent counterion for forming salts of basic drug compounds, as an alternative to the related mesylate or tosylate salts. When used in this way such a salt is called a naphthalenedisulfonate salt, as seen with the most common salt form of the stimulant drug CFT.  The disodium salt is also used as an electrolyte in certain kinds of chromatography.

References

Reagents for organic chemistry
Naphthalenesulfonic acids